Oscar Obuile Ncenga (born 27 February 1984) is a Motswana footballer playing for the Botswana national football team.

Early life

Club career

International career

Style of play

Career statistics

Honours

Club
 Township Rollers
Botswana Premier League:7
2009-10, 2010-11, 2013-14, 2015-16, 2016-17, 2017-18, 2018-19
FA Cup:1
2010
Mascom Top 8 Cup:2
2011-12, 2017-18

References

Living people
Botswana footballers
1984 births
Botswana international footballers
Township Rollers F.C. players
People from Central District (Botswana)
Association football central defenders